The Rochester Mustangs were a senior ice hockey team from Rochester, Minnesota that played in the United States Hockey League from 1961 until the senior Mustangs ceased operations after the 1969-70 season.

Notable players
Herb Brooks, NHL head coach and coach of the U.S. "Miracle on Ice" gold medal team at the 1980 Winter Olympics
Craig Falkman, played in the WHA with the Minnesota Fighting Saints
Gary Gambucci, NHL and WHA player
Ken Johannson, Canadian-born American ice hockey player, coach and general manager of the United States men's national ice hockey team
George Konik, NHL and WHA player
Leonard Lilyholm, U.S. Olympian and player with the WHA's Minnesota Fighting Saints
Lou Nanne, player, coach and general manager of the Minnesota North Stars
Art Strobel, played in the NHL with the New York Rangers

References

Defunct ice hockey teams in Minnesota
Senior ice hockey teams
United States Hockey League teams
Sports in Rochester, Minnesota
1961 establishments in Minnesota
1970 disestablishments in Minnesota
Ice hockey clubs established in 1961
Ice hockey clubs disestablished in 1970